Waverly Bridge may refer to:

Waverly Bridge (Mississippi), spans Tombigbee River in Lowndes and Clay counties, Mississippi, listed on the NRHP in Lowndes County
Waverly Bridge (Missouri)